Casemaker is a Web-based legal research system that is part of Fastcase following a 2021 merger. State bar associations join the Casemaker system to provide online legal research services for dues-paying attorney members.
The Casemaker system allows users to search and browse a variety of legal information such as statutes, regulations, and case law on the Web. Casemaker is designed to be navigable and provide its users with current and accurate legal materials.

See also
 LexisNexis
 Westlaw

References

External links
 Casemaker public site 

Online law databases